Coqeloa is a small village in Vanua Levu, Macuata Province, Fiji. It has a population of about 1,000. From Labasa it is 30 Kilometres (19 miles) and the trip takes around 50 minutes by bus.

The main sport in Coqeloa is soccer.

It has one school, Coqeloa Sangam School.

References

Populated places in Fiji